The State of Sequoyah was a proposed state to be established from the Indian Territory in the eastern part of present-day Oklahoma. In 1905, with the end of tribal governments looming (as prescribed by the Curtis Act of 1898), Native Americans of the Five Civilized Tribes—the Cherokee, Choctaw, Chickasaw, Creek (Muscogee), and Seminole—in Indian Territory proposed to create a state as a means to retain control of their lands. Their intention was to have a state under Native American constitution and governance. The proposed state was to be named in honor of Sequoyah, the Cherokee who created a writing system in 1825 for the Cherokee language.

Background 

Starting in 1890, when Congress passed the Oklahoma Organic Act, the land that now forms the State of Oklahoma was made up of two separate territories: Oklahoma Territory to the west and the Indian Territory to the east. The Indian Territory had a large Native American population. The territory had been reduced by required land cessions after the Civil War, land runs, and other treaties with the United States. In the 1900 US Census, Native Americans composed 13.4 percent of the population in the future state. By 1905, the Five Civilized Tribes comprised about 10% of the Indian Territory’s total population of around 600,000 people.

Until 1903, the Five Civilized Tribes and other tribes in Indian Territory had generally opposed all local and national efforts for statehood, whether they were single or joint with Oklahoma Territory. That changed as the date set by Congress (March 4, 1906) for the breakup of tribal governments and communal lands in the territory approached. The desire of tribal leaders to retain their historic authority and for the territory to be admitted as a single state, apart from Oklahoma Territory, culminated at the Sequoyah Convention, which met as a whole in 1905 on August 21 and 22 and September 5 to 8.

Constitutional convention 

The Sequoyah Constitutional Convention met in Muskogee, on August 21, 1905. General Pleasant Porter, Principal Chief of the Creek Nation, was selected as president of the convention. The elected delegates decided that the executive officers of the Five Civilized Tribes would also be appointed as vice-presidents: William C. Rogers, Principal Chief of the Cherokees; William H. Murray, appointed by Chickasaw Governor Douglas H. Johnston to represent the Chickasaws; Chief Green McCurtain of the Choctaws; Chief John Brown of the Seminoles; and Charles N. Haskell, selected to represent the Creeks (as General Porter had been elected President). Muscogee journalist Alexander Posey served as secretary.

The convention drafted a constitution, drew up a plan of organization for the government, put together a map showing the counties to be established, and elected delegates to go to the United States Congress to petition for statehood, along with 2 Democrats and 2 Republicans who were to serve as congressmen. On November 7, 1905, voters in the territory approved the constitution and statehood petition by 56,279 to 9,073.

President Theodore Roosevelt then proposed a compromise that would join Indian Territory with Oklahoma Territory to form a single state and resulted in passage of the Oklahoma Enabling Act, which he signed June 16, 1906. Oklahoma became the 46th state on November 16, 1907.

Although the State of Sequoyah never came into existence, its constitution made an important contribution to Oklahoma history by its many similarities to the later Oklahoma Constitution. They shared an underlying populist distrust of elected officials. The convention also catapulted Haskell, Murray, and others further into the public arena, securing for Indian Territory a solid seat at the debate at the Oklahoma Constitutional Convention.

In fiction 
In the Southern Victory series by Harry Turtledove, Sequoyah is a Confederate state where the Five Civilized Tribes are granted autonomy and special protections, including restrictions on immigration to the state. After the First Great War, Sequoyah was annexed by the United States, which capitalized on its oil deposits. When plebiscites were held in 1941 in the former Confederate states of Kentucky, Houston, and Sequoyah, only Sequoyah voted to remain a part of the United States as a result of the migration of US citizens to the state. That served as the casus belli for conflict in North America during the Second Great War.

See also 
 Cherokee Commission
 Former Indian reservations in Oklahoma
 Hitchcock County, Sequoyah
 Pushmataha County, Sequoyah

References

External links 
 Large map showing the Oklahoma and Indian Territories in 1895
 Oklahoma Digital Maps: Digital Collections of Oklahoma and Indian Territory

1900s in Indian Territory
Pre-statehood history of Oklahoma
Sequoyah
1900s in Oklahoma Territory
Native American nationalism